Spinifex longifolius, commonly known as beach spinifex, is a perennial grass that grows in sandy regions along the seacoast. It also lives in most deserts around Australia.

Description
It grows as a tussock from 30 centimetres to a metre high, and up to two metres wide. It has long flat leaves, and green or brown flowers.

It is similar in appearance to S. littoreus, but that species has hard, sharp leaves capable of drawing blood, whereas the leaves of S. longifolius are a good deal softer.

Taxonomy
It was first published by Robert Brown in his 1810 Prodromus Florae Novae Hollandiae.

Distribution and habitat
It occurs on coastal dunes of white sand, in Australia, Indonesia, and Thailand. In Australia, it occurs from Cape Leeuwin in Western Australia, north and east to the western edge of Cape York Peninsula in Queensland.

Aboriginal uses
The Noongar people of southwest Western Australia used the juice from the young tips of the plant to drip into eyes as a relief for conjunctivitis.

References

Further reading

External links
GBIF Occurrence data for Spinifex longifolius

Panicoideae
Bunchgrasses of Asia
Bunchgrasses of Australasia
Flora of Thailand
Flora of Malesia
Flora of New Guinea
Flora of the Northern Territory
Flora of Queensland
Flora of South Australia
Angiosperms of Western Australia
Plants described in 1810
Taxa named by Robert Brown (botanist, born 1773)